Mares is a surname, and may refer to:

 Abner Mares (born 1985), Mexican boxer
 Harry Mares (1938-2018), American educator and politician
 Osmar Mares (born 1987), Mexican footballer
 Paul Mares (1900–1949), American musician